The 2023 ABN AMRO Open was a men's tennis tournament played on indoor hard courts. It took place at the Rotterdam Ahoy in the Dutch city of Rotterdam, between 13 and 19 February 2023. It was the 50th edition of the Rotterdam Open, and part of the ATP Tour 500 series on the 2023 ATP Tour. The tournament also included a wheelchair tennis singles and doubles draw for both men and women. This was the first year that the women's wheelchair tournament took place.

Champions

Singles 

  Daniil Medvedev def.  Jannik Sinner, 5–7, 6–2, 6–2

Doubles 

  Ivan Dodig /  Austin Krajicek def.  Rohan Bopanna /  Matthew Ebden, 7–6(7–5), 2–6, [12–10]

Points and prize money

Point distribution

Prize money 

*per team

Singles main-draw entrants

Seeds 

 1 Rankings are as of 6 February 2022.

Other entrants 
The following players received wildcards into the main draw:
  Gijs Brouwer
  Tallon Griekspoor
  Tim van Rijthoven

The following player received entry using a protected ranking into the singles main draw:
  Stan Wawrinka

The following players received entry from the qualifying draw:
  Grégoire Barrère
  Aslan Karatsev
  Constant Lestienne
  Mikael Ymer

The following player received entry as lucky loser:
  Quentin Halys

Withdrawals 
  Borna Ćorić → replaced by  Quentin Halys
  Dan Evans → replaced by  David Goffin
  Karen Khachanov → replaced by  Benjamin Bonzi

Doubles main-draw entrants

Seeds 

1 Rankings as of 6 February 2023.

Other entrants 
The following pairs received wildcards into the doubles main draw:
  Tallon Griekspoor /  Botic van de Zandschulp
  Petros Tsitsipas /  Stefanos Tsitsipas

The following pair received entry from the qualifying draw:
  Sander Gillé /  Joran Vliegen

Withdrawals 
  Karen Khachanov /  Andrey Rublev → replaced by  Fabrice Martin /  Andrey Rublev

References

External links 
 

ABN AMRO Open
ABN AMRO Open
Rotterdam Open
ABN Amro Open